Novozybkov is a historical town in Bryansk Oblast, Russia. Population:  The city has a branch of the Bryansk State University.

History
It was founded in 1701 and was granted town status in 1809. Novozybkov was a major hemp supplier in the 18th and 19th centuries, particularly for the production of ropes for the Imperial Russian Navy. Following the Crimean War, the demand for hemp fell, and cultivation stopped altogether at the beginning of the 20th century.

The world's first ground effect vehicle designer Rostislav Alexeyev was born in the town.

During World War II, Novozybkov was occupied by the German Army from 16 August 1941 to 25 September 1943.

On April 26, 1986, Novozybkovsky District and the neighbouring Krasnogorsky District were contaminated with radioactive fallout from the Chernobyl disaster. Today, these two areas remain the most contaminated in the Russian Federation as to the total contaminated area and the intensity of contamination (curies per km²). The area not suitable for human habitation (more than ) starts at 1 km west of Novozybkov city limits.

Ecological problems 
As a result of the Chernobyl disaster on April 26, 1986, part of the territory of Bryansk Oblast has been contaminated with radionuclides (mainly Gordeyevsky, Klimovsky, Klintsovsky, Krasnogorsky, Surazhsky, and Novozybkovsky Districts). In 1999, some 226,000 people lived in areas with the contamination level above , representing approximately 16% of the oblast's population.

Administrative and municipal status
Within the framework of administrative divisions, Novozybkov serves as the administrative center of Novozybkovsky District, even though it is not a part of it. As an administrative division, it is incorporated separately as Novozybkovsky Urban Administrative Okrug—an administrative unit with the status equal to that of the districts. As a municipal division, Novozybkovsky Urban Administrative Okrug is incorporated as Novozybkov Urban Okrug.

Notable people
 Rostislav Alexeyev (1916–1980), designer of high-speed shipbuilding
 Aleksandra Belcova (1892–1981), painter
 David Dragunsky (1910–1992), general
 Grigori Roshal (1899–1983), film director and screenwriter
 Samson Samsonov (1921–2002), film director and screenwriter
 Sascha Schapiro (1890–1942), Ukrainian anarchist revolutionary
 Mariya Sergeyenko (1891–1987), scholar of Roman history and philologist
 Oscar Leschinsky (1892–1919), poet, artist, Bolshevik revolutionary and commissar, executed in Dagestan

References

Notes

Sources

External links
Website of Novozybkov
Website about Novozybkov 
 The murder of the Jews of Novozybkov during World War II, at Yad Vashem website.

Cities and towns in Bryansk Oblast
Novozybkovsky Uyezd
Populated places established in 1701
1701 establishments in Russia